Bohuňovice may refer to places in the Czech Republic:

Bohuňovice (Olomouc District), a municipality and village in the Olomouc Region
Bohuňovice (Svitavy District), a municipality and village in the Pardubice Region